Zafar Ali Hilaly (born 1942) is a Pakistani political analyst and diplomat who has previously served as his country's ambassador to Yemen, Nigeria, and from February 2001 Italy.  He was educated at Highgate School.

Hilaly is a columnist and frequently writes for newspapers such as the Daily Times, The Express Tribune, and The News International. Additionally, he makes frequent appearances on 92 News in his capacity as an analyst.

Hilaly was considered instrumental in establishing an international class Pakistan School in the city of Sana'a, Yemen.

He is the son of Agha Hilaly, who served as Pakistan's Ambassador to the United States from 1966–1977. His uncle Agha Shahi served as the Foreign Minister of Pakistan in the Zia ul-Haq government.

He is married to Shamim Hilaly, a Pakistani television and film actress.

Further reading

References

Living people
People educated at Highgate School
Pakistani people of Iranian descent
Muhajir people
People from Karachi
Ambassadors of Pakistan to Yemen
Ambassadors of Pakistan to Italy
High Commissioners of Pakistan to Nigeria
Year of birth missing (living people)
Tyabji family